Kesato Miyazaki (born 4 April 1981) is a Japanese speed skater. He competed in two events at the 2006 Winter Olympics.

References

1981 births
Living people
Japanese male speed skaters
Olympic speed skaters of Japan
Speed skaters at the 2006 Winter Olympics
Sportspeople from Gunma Prefecture
Asian Games bronze medalists for Japan
Asian Games silver medalists for Japan
Asian Games medalists in speed skating
Speed skaters at the 2003 Asian Winter Games
Speed skaters at the 2007 Asian Winter Games
Medalists at the 2003 Asian Winter Games
21st-century Japanese people